James Thomson (born 1966) is an accountant and Councilman for Walbrook Ward of the City of London Corporation since 2013. He was chief executive officer for Keepmoat and was a non-executive board member of the Housing and Finance Institute.

Thomson was educated at Oriel College, Oxford.

Thomson was appointed chief financial officer of Keepmoat in 2012. Then in January 2015, following the acquisition of Keepmoat by TDR Capital and Sun Capital, he was promoted to the post of deputy CEO, later becoming CEO - a post he retained until February 2019.

Following the Autumn Statement of Conservative chancellor Philip Hammond in November 2016, Thomson welcomed the £2.3 billion housing infrastructure fund as he saw it as allowing local authorities to create joint ventures to deliver housing.

In June 2019, he was appointed interim CEO at M J Gleeson, and became the permanent CEO in December 2019. In April 2022, Thomson announced his intention to stand down on 31 December 2022, with Vistry Group's chief operating officer Graham Prothero nominated as his successor. Thomson will become a non-executive board member at Gleeson in 2023.

References

Living people
Councilmen of the City of London
1966 births
Alumni of the University of Oxford